East Springfield is a census-designated place (CDP) in northwestern Salem Township, Jefferson County, Ohio, United States. It has a post office with the ZIP code 43925. The community is part of the Weirton–Steubenville, WV-OH Metropolitan Statistical Area.

Demographics

History
East Springfield was laid out in 1803. A post office called East Springfield has been in operation since 1849.

Education
East Springfield is part of the Edison Local School District. Campuses serving the community include John Gregg Elementary School (Preschool-Grade 4), Springfield Middle School (Grades 5-8), and Edison High School  (Grades 9-12).

References

Census-designated places in Jefferson County, Ohio